is a railway station on the Takayama Main Line in the town of Kawabe, Kamo District, Gifu Prefecture, Japan, operated by Central Japan Railway Company (JR Central).

Lines

Station layout
Nakakawabe Station has two opposed ground-level side platforms connected by a footbridge. The station is unattended.

Platforms

Adjacent stations

History
Nakakawabe Station opened on November 25, 1922. The station was absorbed into the JR Central network upon the privatization of Japanese National Railways (JNR) on April 1, 1987. A new station building was completed in January 2015.

Surrounding area
 Kawabe Town Hall

See also

 List of Railway Stations in Japan

Railway stations in Gifu Prefecture
Takayama Main Line
Railway stations in Japan opened in 1922
Stations of Central Japan Railway Company
Kawabe, Gifu